T. A. Sarasvati Amma (Tekkath Amayankottukurussi Kalathil Sarasvati, also spelled as T. A. Saraswathi Amma; 26 December 1918 – 15 August 2000) was a scholar born in Cherpulassery, Palakkad District, Kerala, India. She has contributed to the fields of history of Mathematics and Sanskrit, through her work on Geometry of ancient and medieval India.

Biography
Sarasvati Amma (born in Cherpulachery, Palakkad district, Kerala) was the second daughter of her mother Kuttimalu Amma and father Marath Achutha Menon. She took her basic degree in mathematics and physics from Madras University and obtained an M.A. degree in Sanskrit from Benares Hindu University. She did her research under the guidance of Dr. V. Raghavan, a Sanskrit scholar. Sarasvati Amma taught at Sree Kerala Varma College, Thrissur, Maharaja's College, Ernakulam and also at Women's College, Ranchi. She served Shree Shree Lakshmi Narain Trust Mahila Mahavidyalaya, Dhanbad, Jharkhand as its principal from 1973 to 1980. After retirement she spent her last years in her home town Ottappalam. She died in 2000. Her younger sister T. A. Rajalakshmi was a well-known story-writer and novelist in Malayalam, but committed suicide in 1965.

Academic career
The Kerala Mathematical Association started a regular Prof. T. A. Sarasvati Amma Memorial Lecture in its annual conference in 2002. In the words of Michio Yano, who reviewed Sarasvati Amma's book Geometry in Ancient and Medieval India, the book "established a firm foundation for the study of Indian geometry".

According to David Mumford, along with Kim Plofker's book Mathematics in India, "there is only one other survey, Datta and Singh’s 1938 History of Hindu Mathematics...supplemented by the equally hard to find Geometry in Ancient and Medieval India by Sarasvati Amma (1979)", where, "one can get an overview of most topics" in Indian mathematics.

Her book Geometry in Ancient and Medieval India is a survey of the Sanskrit and Prakrt scientific and quasi-scientific literature of India, beginning with the Vedic literature and ending with the early part of the 17th century. It deals in detail with the Sulba Sutras in the Vedic literature, with the mathematical parts of Jaina Canonical works and of the Hindu Siddhantas and with the contributions to geometry made by the astronomer mathematicians Aryabhata I & II, Sripati, Bhaskara I & II, Sangamagrama Madhava, Paramesvara, Nilakantha, his disciples and a host of others. The works of the mathematicians Mahavira, Sridhara and Narayana Pandita and the Bakshali Manuscript have also been studied. The work seeks to explode the theory that the Indian mathematical genius was predominantly algebraic and computational and that it eschewed proofs and rationales. There was a school in India which delighted in geometric demonstrations of algebraic results.

Selected publications

Book

Papers

References

Malayali people
Indian women mathematicians
1918 births
2000 deaths
20th-century Indian mathematicians
20th-century Indian women writers
Scientists from Kerala
People from Palakkad district
University of Madras alumni
Writers from Kerala
Indian women science writers
Indian scientific authors
Indian Sanskrit scholars
Banaras Hindu University alumni
Academic staff of Maharaja's College, Ernakulam
20th-century Indian women scientists
Women writers from Kerala
20th-century Indian non-fiction writers
Women scientists from Kerala
Indian technology writers
Indian popular science writers
20th-century women mathematicians